Late Call was Scottish Television's version of The Epilogue, presenting five minutes of religious thought late at night. Launched in 1960, it was generally, but not always, the final programme of the day's transmission. It continued to be broadcast after Scottish Television began 24-hour transmission. The programme ended in 1989.

It was parodied by Rikki Fulton in the comedy show Scotch and Wry where it was named "Last Call". His character, "Reverend I.M. Jolly", was an exaggerated version of the clerical and lay representatives from all the mainstream churches in Scotland who often featured in Late Call.

The programme was not the only programme from the Religious Department of Scottish Television, but arguably the best known. Producers were Rev. Dr Nelson Gray, a congregational minister, and Rev. Eric Hudson, a minister of the Church of Scotland.

References 

Religious mass media in the United Kingdom
British religious television series
Scottish television shows